Goodman Fielder is an Australian manufacturer, marketer and distributor of bread, small goods, dairy products, margarine, oil, dressings and various food ingredients. Its main operations are in New Zealand, Australia, Fiji, Papua New Guinea, and New Caledonia, with over 40 manufacturing sites. The company employs over 5,000 people, and has more than 120 brands.

History
Goodman Group was founded as A.S. Paterson & Co. ltd in Dunedin in 1886 as a general importing firm by Scottish-Born businessman and philanthropist Alexander Stronach Paterson. It was listed on the New Zealand Stock Exchange in 1949 and would come to focus mainly on the grocery business. The firm was renamed as Goodman Group in 1979 after Paterson's grandson Alex was ousted as chairman in 1976 by "dissatisfied baking interests".

Goodman Fielder was founded in 1986 after the merger of Allied Mills Ltd and Goodman Group Ltd. Since the merger in 1986, the company has purchased a further 13 companies. The company was taken over by Burns Philp in 2003.

Goodman Fielder was relisted on the share market at the end of 2005 with Burns Philp retaining a 20% share (this share was subsequently sold in 2007). As part of the IPO, New Zealand Dairy Foods brands Meadowfresh, Tararua, Kiwi, Huttons, Anchor Cheese (under licence), Top Hat and Puhoi cheese became part of Goodman Fielder.

The Uncle Tobys and Bluebird snack food businesses of the "original" Goodman Fielder were not included in the float, the former being sold to Nestle and the latter to PepsiCo.

Chris Delaney was Goodman Fielder's CEO from 4 July 2011, he is the former Asia Pacific President of Campbell Soup Company. He resigned following a takeover of the company by Wilmar International and First Pacific joint-venture in March 2015 for $1.3 billion Australian dollars.

Goodman Fielder's CEO was Scott Weitemeyer, until the takeover by Wilmar International.

In 2019, Wilmar International acquired First Pacific's 50% share in the company.

Brands
The company's brands include:
 Cornwell's 
 Country Life Bakery
 Cow and Gate
 Crisco
 Ernest Adams – a New Zealand bakery brand and part of the Goodman Fielder group of companies, its products include cakes, desserts, loaves, biscuits, meringues, cakes, sponges, puddings and tarts. The company was originally called Adams Bruce Limited, with Ernest Alfred Adams in partnership with Christchurch baker Hugh Bruce. The company grew rapidly, with bakeries in Auckland, Wellington, Christchurch, and Dunedin by the time of Bruce's retirement in 1929. Following Bruce's retirement, the company was split, with Adams Bruce operating in the North Island and a new company, Ernest Adams Ltd., taking over the South Island arm of the business. Despite his official retirement, Bruce continued to work for the company as manager of the Christchurch factory until his death in 1939. In 2022 the Ernest Adams brand of baked goods was discontinued.
 Edmonds
 ETA
 Freya's Continental Style Bread
 Gold'n Canola
 Helga's Continental Bakehouse
 Irvines
 La Famiglia
 Logicol
 Meadow Fresh
 MeadowLea
 Mighty Soft
 Molenberg
 Mother's Choice
 Nature's Fresh
 Olivani
 Olive Grove
 Paradise
 Pampas
 Praise
 Puhoi Valley Cheese
 Quality Bakers – a New Zealand brand of bread products, it is a subsidiary of Goodman Fielder and has bakeries throughout Australia and New Zealand.
 Tararua
 Vogel's – a bread based on a recipe by Alfred Vogel
 White Wings

Goodman Fielder operate in the dairy, baking and grocery segments of the food manufacturing market, and have a portfolio of retail and food service brands, including Meadow Fresh, Puhoi Valley, Bouton D'or, Tararua, Vogel's, Quality Bakers, Molenberg, Natures Fresh and Meadowlea.

Internationally
The company exports many of its products to over 30 countries. Goodman Fielder has four divisions, home ingredients, baking, dairy and commercial fats & oils.

References

External links
 

Food manufacturers of Australia
Food manufacturers of New Zealand
Food and drink companies based in Sydney
Manufacturing companies based in Sydney
New Zealand brands